K. V. Raghunatha Reddy (4 September 1924 – 4 March 2002) was an Indian politician. He served three terms as Member of Rajya Sabha from Andhra Pradesh during the period 1962-68, 1968–74 and 1974-1980. He served as the Governor of Tripura (1990–1993), the Governor of West Bengal (1993–1998) and the Governor of Odisha (31 January 1997 - 12 February 1997 and 13 December 1997 – 27 April 1998). He also worked as union labour minister.

References

Governors of West Bengal
Governors of Odisha
Governors of Tripura
1924 births
2002 deaths
Rajya Sabha members from Andhra Pradesh